Sulaymaniyah Governorate or Sulaymaniyah Province is a mountainous governorate in the Kurdistan Region of Iraq. Its largest city is Sulaymaniyah. Halabja Governorate was formerly the Halabja District of Sulaymaniyah, until it became a separate governorate in 2014.

Provincial Government 
 Governor: Dr. Haval Abubakir
 Deputy Governor: Ahmed Ali Ahmed
 Provincial Council Chairman (PCC): Azad Mohammad Amin

Districts

See also 
 Hazar Merd Cave
 Parviz border crossing
 Kermanshah Province

References

External links 

  
 Iraq Inter-Agency Information & Analysis Unit Reports, Maps and Assessments of Iraq's Governorates from the UN Inter-Agency Information & Analysis Unit

 
Governorates of Iraq
Geography of Iraqi Kurdistan